Wawan Widiantoro (born January 20, 1977) is an Indonesian footballer who currently plays for PSMS Medan in the Indonesia Super League.

Club statistics

Hounors

Clubs
Persik Kediri :
Liga Indonesia Premier Division champions : 1 (2006)

References

External links

1977 births
Association football defenders
Living people
Indonesian footballers
Liga 1 (Indonesia) players
Persik Kediri players
PSMS Medan players
Indonesian Premier Division players